This is a list of finance ministers of Dominica. The Ministry of Finance is located on Kennedy Avenue, Roseau.

 Frank Baron, 1960 - 1961
 Edward Oliver LeBlanc, 1961 - 1970
 Ronald Armour, 1970 - July 1973
Patrick John, 1973 - July 1974
 Victor Riviere, March 1975 - June 1979
 Michael Douglas, June 1979 - 1980
 Eugenia Charles, July 1980 - February 1995
 Julius Timothy, June 1995 - February 2000
 Ambrose George, February 2000 - 2001
 Pierre Charles, 2001 - 2004
 Roosevelt Skerrit, January 2004 - December 2022
 Irving McIntyre, December 2022 - present

References

Finance
Finance Ministers
Politicians